The 2012 Montedio Yamagata season sees Montedio Yamagata return to J.League Division 2 after being relegated in the 2011 J.League Division 1. This will be their 16th season overall in the second tier. Montedio Yamagata are also competing in the 2012 Emperor's Cup.

Players

Competitions

J.League

League table

Matches

Emperor's Cup

References

Montedio Yamagata
Montedio Yamagata seasons